Khalu Mohammad Ali (also Romanized as Khālū Moḩammad ‘Alī; also known as Khālū Moḩammad) is a village in Sigar Rural District, in the Central District of Lamerd County, Fars Province, Iran. At the 2006 census, its population was 418, in 103 families.

References 

Populated places in Lamerd County